Pedro Maldonado may refer to:

Surname:
Pedro Maldonado (bishop) (died 1566), Spanish Roman Catholic bishop
Pedro Vicente Maldonado (1704–1748), South-American scientist

Geography:
Pedro Vicente Maldonado Canton, town and canton of Ecuador